Shahrak-e Boneh Kolaghi (also Romanized as Shahrak-e Boneh Kolāghī) is a village in Rizab Rural District, Qatruyeh District, Neyriz County, Fars Province, Iran. At the 2006 census, its population was 546, in 125 families.

References 

Populated places in Neyriz County